Jona Efoloko (born 23 September 1999) is a British sprinter. A former European youth (U18) and World Junior (U20) champion in 200 metres, In 2022, he was part of the Great Britain relay team that won European and Commonwealth gold, and World Championship bronze, in the men's 4 x 100 metres relay.

Efokolo was born in Kinshasa in the  Democratic Republic of Congo before relocating to Britain, where his club is the Manchester Sale Harriers.
He won the European U18 Championships 200m in 2016 and won silver in the same event in 2017. He won the 200m title at the 2018 IAAF World Junior Championships in Tampere, setting his personal best in 20:48.

References

External links
 

1999 births
Living people
British male sprinters
Black British sportspeople
Democratic Republic of the Congo emigrants to the United Kingdom
Sportspeople from Kinshasa
Alumni of the University of East London
World Athletics Championships athletes for Great Britain
World Athletics Championships medalists
Commonwealth Games gold medallists for England
Athletes (track and field) at the 2022 Commonwealth Games
Commonwealth Games medallists in athletics
European Athletics Championships winners
21st-century British people
Medallists at the 2022 Commonwealth Games